Anthony Lagoon is a cattle station on the Barkly Tableland in the Northern Territory, Australia. Eva Downs is run as an outstation of Anthony Lagoon and employs a separate manager, but is part of the same operation.

Description
The neighbouring property to the north is Walhallow Station.

The station contains black soil plains covered in Mitchell grass and Flinders grasses and red soil country dominated by spinifex, saltbush and other herbage. The flooded lake country around the permanent water sources support stands of Coolibah, Lignum, Bluebush, Verbine and tussock grassland.

History

The property named after a permanent lagoon on the Cresswell Creek, discovered by Ernest Favenc in 1878. It became a watering hole for cattle stock being moved from the Kimberleys to Queensland. A police station was established here in 1895 to keep a watch over the cattle passing through the area. This was absorbed into the Avon Downs Police District in 1982.

Mr O. Wales of McLeod, Hunt and Company opened a general store at Anthony Lagoon in 1889.

Flooding occurred in 1891 when the rivers rose and the police station was submerged under  of water.

The station is mentioned as a postal delivery point in chapter 12 of the novel We of the Never Never  by Aeneas Gunn published in 1908.

The Anthony's Lagoon Pastoral Company was established in 1929 with capital of £100,000. The first directors were James Malcolm Newman, A.J. Cotton, V.R. Cotton and B.T. Crawford.

In 1935 the property was owned by Mr. J. M. Newman, an engineer, who had other pastoral interests including the Cabulcha stud farm in Queensland used to breed bulls for use in his Territory herds. Newman still owned the station in 1948

The property was sold to the Scottish Australian Company in 1949. The Company introduced Shorthorn cattle to Anthony Lagoon as they had to their other Territory property, Austral Downs. The shorthorns were replacing the Aberdeen Angus herd which the campany found had fattened so well at Austral.

In 2006, Anthony Lagoon and Eva Downs stations were both sold by the current owner, Heytesbury, to Australian Agricultural Company. The airport code for Anthony Lagoon is AYL.

Several small parcels of land on the station were declared heritage areas by the state government in 2008, these included the Anthony Lagoon Davey Paxman Steam Engine, the 1906 cattle dip, the 1945 cattle dip and Police Tracker's Quarters and Gaol.

See also
List of ranches and stations
List of the largest stations in Australia

References

External links

Pastoral leases in the Northern Territory
Stations (Australian agriculture)